Kurumpilavu  is a village in Thrissur district in the state of Kerala, India.
Major area of Kurumpilavu is covered with paddy and coconut fields. Kurumpilavu has got two Major Hindu temples, Devi (Thiruvanikkavu Amma ) and Krishna (Kurumpilavu Shree Krishna Kshethram CBE and several other family owned temples, 
Nearby Kurumpilavu has One Christian Church and One Mosque, has one LP government school and One management UP and High School in the name of Bhodhananda Swami, the first disciple of Sree Narayana Guru. 

Nearest Town to Kurumpilavu is Thriprayar which is located 7 kilometers to the west and another is Cherpu which is 7 km to the east.

Kurumpilavu is balanced in cast and religion and politics and peaceful region.

Demographics
 India census, Kurumpilavu had a population of 13677 with 6413 males and 7264 females.

References

Villages in Thrissur district